Vanatta is an unincorporated community in Licking County, in the U.S. state of Ohio.

History
Vanatta had its start when the railroad was extended to that point.  A post office called Vanatta was established in 1857, and remained in operation until 1955.

References

Unincorporated communities in Licking County, Ohio
1857 establishments in Ohio
Populated places established in 1857
Unincorporated communities in Ohio